The 2001 California Golden Bears football team was an American football team that represented the University of California, Berkeley in the Pacific-10 Conference (Pac-10) during the 2001 NCAA Division I-A football season. In their fifth and final year under head coach Tom Holmoe, the Golden Bears compiled a 1–10 record (0–8 against Pac-10 opponents), finished in last place in the Pac-10, and were outscored by their opponents by a combined score of 431 to 201.

The team's statistical leaders included Kyle Boller with 1,741 passing yards, Terrell Williams with 688 rushing yards, and Charon Arnold with 606 receiving yards.

Following a loss to Arizona and an 0–8 start, Holmoe announced his resignation effective at the end of the season.

Schedule

References

California
California Golden Bears football seasons
California Golden Bears football